Eddie Collins (1887–1951) was an American baseball player.

Eddie Collins may also refer to:

Eddie Collins (actor) (1883–1940), American comedian, actor and singer
Eddie Collins (miner) (1894–1972), Yorkshire miner, labour activist and local councillor
Eddie Collins (catcher) (fl. 1910–1918), American baseball player
Eddie Collins Jr. (1916–2000), American baseball player
Eddie Collins (politician) (born 1941), Irish politician, Minister of State
Greydon Square (Eddie Collins, born 1981), American rapper
Eddie Collins (guitarist), American guitarist with Shai Hulud

See also
Ed Collins (disambiguation)
Edward Collins (disambiguation)
Edmund Collins (disambiguation)
Edwyn Collins (born 1959), Scottish musician, producer and record label owner